Koo (Köö) is a rural locality (a selo) in Chelushmanskoye Rural Settlement of Ulagansky District, the Altai Republic, Russia. The population was 236 as of 2016. There are 5 streets.

Geography 
Koo is located on the left bank of the Chulyshman River, 84 km north of Ulagan (the district's administrative centre) by road.

Ethnicity 
The village is inhabited by Altai people-Telengits and others.

References 

Rural localities in Ulagansky District